Laurendeau is a surname. Notable people with the surname include:

Adélard Laurendeau, politician Quebec, Canada and a Member of the Legislative Assembly of Quebec
Aldéric Laurendeau (1890–1961), Quebec politician and physician
André Laurendeau (1912–1968), journalist, politician, playwright co-chair of the Royal Commission on Bilingualism and Biculturalism in Quebec, Canada
Louis-Philippe Laurendeau (1861–1916), Canadian composer and bandmaster
Marcel Laurendeau, politician in Manitoba, Canada
Martin Laurendeau (born 1964), former touring professional tennis player and present coach

See also
78 Laurendeau, bus route in Montreal, Quebec, Canada
Cégep André-Laurendeau, CEGEP pre-university and technical college in Montreal (LaSalle), Quebec, Canada
Édifice André-Laurendeau, eleven story office tower in Quebec City, Canada
Laurendeau-Dunton commission or Royal Commission on Bilingualism and Biculturalism
Laranda (disambiguation)
Larinda
Larunda